Hot R&B/Hip-Hop Songs is a chart published by Billboard that ranks the top-performing songs in the United States in African-American-oriented musical genres; the chart has undergone various name changes since its launch in 1958 to reflect the evolution of such genres.  In 1987, the chart was published under the title Hot Black Singles.  During the year, 33 different singles topped the chart, based on playlists submitted by radio stations and surveys of retail sales outlets. 

In the issue of Billboard dated January 3, Bobby Brown's track "Girlfriend" was at number one, retaining its position from the previous week.  The following week it was replaced by "Control", the first of three number ones in 1987 for Janet Jackson, who also took "Let's Wait Awhile", and "The Pleasure Principle" to the peak position.  She also provided featured vocals on "Diamonds" by trumpeter Herb Alpert.  Her brother Michael achieved three number ones during the year, topping the listing with "I Just Can't Stop Loving You", "Bad", and "The Way You Make Me Feel".  Freddie Jackson (no relation to Janet and Michael), Luther Vandross, Lisa Lisa and Cult Jam, and Stephanie Mills all had two chart-toppers in 1987.  Michael Jackson's total of five weeks at number one was the highest by any artist.  His song "Bad" was one of four singles to spend three consecutive weeks in the top spot, tying with singles by Jody Watley, Prince, and Stephanie Mills for the year's longest run atop the chart.

A number of acts achieved their first number-one singles on the chart in 1987, including the System, Gregory Hines, Alpert, Atlantic Starr, Lisa Lisa and Cult Jam, Alexander O'Neal, the Force M.D.'s, Siedah Garrett, and LL Cool J.  Additionally, Angela Winbush topped the chart for the first time as a solo artist having previously reached number one as half of the duo René & Angela, and Jody Watley gained her first solo chart-topper having previously reached the peak position as a member of the group Shalamar.  The O'Jays returned to number one after a nine-year hiatus with their single "Lovin' You".

Chart history

References

Works cited

1987
United States RandB Singles
1987 in American music